Cecilie Thomsen (born 29 October 1974) is a Danish actress and model.

Early life and education

Thomsen was born on the island Bogø in Denmark.

Career
Internationally, Cecilie Thomsen is best known for playing the minor Bond girl role of Professor Inga Bergstrøm opposite Pierce Brosnan in the 1997 James Bond feature film Tomorrow Never Dies.

She played in duo with Henning Moritzen in the Danish segment of short film collection Visions of Europe. The segment is called "Europe doesn't exist" and it was directed by Christoffer Boe.

She appeared in the Bryan Adams 1995 music video, "Have You Ever Really Loved a Woman?" directed by Anton Corbijn.

Filmography
Tomorrow Never Dies (1997) – Professor Inga Bergstrom
54 (1998) – VIP Patron
House of Fools (2002) – Lithuanian Sharpshooter
Visions of Europe (2004) – (segment "Denmark: Europe")
Simon & Malou (2009) – Maria (uncredited)

References

External links
 
 
 Hvad blev er af Cecilie Thomsen? 

1974 births
Living people
Danish actresses
Danish female models
Waldorf school alumni
People from Vordingborg Municipality
20th-century Danish actresses
21st-century Danish actresses